Eucalyptus rosacea is a species of mallee that is endemic to Western Australia. It has smooth, greyish bark, linear to narrow oblong adult leaves, flower buds in groups of seven, pink, red or cream-coloured flowers and flattened hemispherical to almost saucer-shaped fruit.

Description
It has smooth greyish bark that is shed in ribbons to reveal pinkish or yellowish new bark. Flowering occurs from November to February and the flowers range in colour from white through pink to deep red.

Taxonomy and naming
Eucalyptus rosacea was first formally described in 1992 by Lawrie Johnson and Ken Hill in the journal Telopea from material collected near Queen Victoria Spring in 1986. The specific epithet (rosacea) is from the Latin word rosaceus, meaning "like the flower of a single rose", referring to the frequently pink colour of the flowers and bark.

Distribution and habitat
This mallee grows in low, open mallee shrubland in yellow or red sandy soils east of Laverton and Queen Victoria Spring to the edge of the Great Victoria Desert.

Conservation status
This eucalypt is classified as "not threatened" by the Western Australian Government Department of Parks and Wildlife.

See also
List of Eucalyptus species

References

Eucalypts of Western Australia
rosacea
Myrtales of Australia
Plants described in 1992
Mallees (habit)
Taxa named by Lawrence Alexander Sidney Johnson
Taxa named by Ken Hill (botanist)